Trucker may refer to:
Truck driver, a person employed as the driver of a truck
Trucker (band), a rock and alternative country band from Lawrence, KS
Truckers (2013 TV series), a 2013 drama television series on BBC One
The first novel in The Nome Trilogy, a series of children's novels by Terry Pratchett
 Truckers (1992 TV series), the UK television series based on the first book from The Nome Trilogy
Trucker (film), a 2008 US feature film
Truckers, an upcoming DreamWorks Animation film

Other uses 

Drive-By Truckers, an alternative country and Southern rock band
Trucker hat, a type of baseball cap
Ice Road Truckers, a reality television series
Space Truckers, a 1996 US feature film